I'd Rather Be in Love prefers to 

 "I'd Rather Be in Love", a Peter, Paul & Mary song on the 1986 album: No Easy Walk to Freedom
 "I'd Rather Be in Love", a Michelle Branch song on the 2001 debut album: The Spirit Room

 Disambiguation pages